"" ("The god of Tokelau"), or "" ("Tokelau for the god"), is the anthem of Tokelau, a territory within the Realm of New Zealand. Adopted in 2012, it was written and composed by Eric Lemuelu Falima. As a Commonwealth realm, the official national anthem is "God Save the King".

History 
In 2005, the Tokelau legislature announced a contest for an anthem for the islands. After a four-year selection process, an entry by Eric Lemuelu Falima was chosen as the winner. The lyrics were subsequently debated and revised until March 2012, when the anthem was adopted.

Lyrics

Notes

References

External links
 2012 MP3 file from the Government of Tokelau website
 2016 MP3 file from the Government of Tokelau website

Tokelauan music
Oceanian anthems